The 2021 Australian Football League finals series was the 125th annual edition of the VFL/AFL finals series.

The series was played over five weeks in August and September, culminating in the 2021 AFL Grand Final. The top eight teams from the 2021 AFL Premiership season qualified for the finals series. AFL finals series have been played under the current format since 2000.

Qualification

Venues 
Due to ongoing COVID-19 restrictions, many clubs played home finals outside their home states for the second consecutive season. The New South Wales venues were unavailable because of a large outbreak in Sydney which precluded interstate travel through the state, and both Sydney clubs had been based outside the state for the last two months of the home-and-away season. The Victorian venues were available despite a smaller outbreak in the state, having hosted home-and-away matches behind closed doors right up to the end of the season, while 'sterile corridor' arrangements were in place to enable interstate travel. However, the league preferred to schedule finals which could be attended in a neutral state rather than behind closed doors in a home state, resulting in no matches being staged in Victoria, either.

Many venues operated with a restricted spectator capacity. For the first week of finals, Adelaide Oval and University of Tasmania Stadium were only allowed up to 20,000 spectators and 10,000 spectators, respectively. For the preliminary final, the allowed capacity of Adelaide Oval was slightly increased to 26,500—50% of the venue's regular total capacity.

Matches 

The system used for the 2021 AFL finals series was a final eight system. The top four teams in the eight received the "double chance" when they play in week-one qualifying finals, such that if a top-four team loses in the first week it still remained in the finals, playing a semi-final the next week against the winner of an elimination final. The bottom four of the eight played knockout games—only the winners survived and moved on to the next week. Home-state advantage ordinarily goes to the team with the higher ladder position in the first two weeks, to the qualifying final winners in the third week, but due to the COVID-19 pandemic, some states were unable to host matches.

In the second week, the winners of the qualifying finals received a bye to the third week (as normal). The losers of the qualifying final played the elimination finals winners in a semi-final. In the third week, the winners of the semi-finals from week two play the winners of the qualifying finals in the first week. The winners of those matches move on to the Grand Final.

The finals were originally due to commence over the weekend of 3–5 September, with a bye week in place between Round 23 and the finals commencing. This bye week was conventional since 2016 and even observed in the delayed 2020 season. However, in an announcement made on 16 August, the bye week was dropped and the first week of finals was brought forward to the weekend of 27–29 August as a contingency, to allow the league to use the bye week at short notice to respond to any unforeseen changes to border or societal restrictions associated with the COVID-19 pandemic, without impacting the scheduled Grand Final date of Saturday 25 September. The bye week was ultimately observed between the preliminary finals and the Grand Final.

Week one (Qualifying and Elimination Finals)

Second Qualifying Final (Port Adelaide vs Geelong)

The second qualifying final saw second-placed  face third-placed . This marked the fifth finals meeting and the second consecutive qualifying final between the two sides.

Scorecard

Second Elimination Final (Sydney vs Greater Western Sydney)

The second elimination final saw sixth-placed  face seventh-placed . This clash marked the third Sydney Derby to take place during the finals and the first since 2018.

Scorecard

First Qualifying Final (Melbourne vs Brisbane Lions)

The first qualifying final saw minor premiers  face the fourth-placed , following Melbourne's first minor premiership since 1964. This was the first finals meeting between the two sides.

Scorecard

First Elimination Final (Western Bulldogs vs Essendon)

The first elimination final saw the fifth-placed  face eighth-placed  in their fourth final, and their first since 1953.

Scorecard

Week two (Semi-Finals)

Second Semi-Final (Geelong vs Greater Western Sydney)

The second semi-final saw the losers of the second qualifying final,  host the winners of the second elimination final, . This was the first finals meeting between the two teams.

Scorecard

First Semi-Final (Brisbane Lions vs Western Bulldogs)

This was the fourth final played between the two teams and the first since 2009.

Scorecard

Week three (Preliminary Finals)

First Preliminary Final (Melbourne vs Geelong)

The first preliminary final saw the winners of the first qualifying final,  host the winners of the second semi-final . The sides' previous encounter came in round 23, with Max Gawn kicking a goal after the siren to secure the minor premiership.

Scorecard

Second Preliminary Final (Port Adelaide vs Western Bulldogs)

The second preliminary final saw the winners of the second qualifying final,  host the winners of the first semi-final . This was the first finals meeting between these two teams.

Scorecard

Week four (Grand Final)

Due to an ongoing COVID-19 lockdown preventing the match from being played with a crowd at the Melbourne Cricket Ground, the match was played at Optus Stadium in Western Australia, making it the second consecutive grand final to be played outside the state of Victoria and also the second consecutive night grand final for viewers on Australia’s Eastern Seaboard.

This was the fifth final played between the two teams, with minor finals played in 1946, 1961 and 1994; this was the second grand final between the two teams after the Footscray (now known as the Western Bulldogs) won in 1954. Melbourne would go on to win by 74 points, their first VFL/AFL premiership in 57 years.

Scoreboard

References

External links

AFL finals series official website

Finals Series, 2021